Cordero is  Spanish  and Italian  last name origin. The name means "young lamb", per the Latin cordarius (a derivative of cordus, meaning ‘young’, ‘new’). It may be an occupational name for a shepherd, or a nickname meaning "lamb".

People with the surname

 Andrea Cordero Lanza di Montezemolo (1925–2017), Italian Cardinal of the Roman Catholic Church
 Angel Cordero Jr. (born 1942), Puerto Rican jockey
 Atilano Cordero Badillo (born 1943), Puerto Rican entrepreneur and supermarket owner
 Chad Cordero (born 1982), American professional baseball player
 Desirée Cordero Ferrer (born 1993), Spanish model, Miss Spain 2014
 Eugene Cordero, American actor
 Federico A. Cordero (1928–2012), Puerto Rican classical guitarist
 Franchy Cordero (born 1994), Dominican baseball player
 Francisco Cordero (born 1975), Dominican professional baseball player
Georgina Febres-Cordero (1861–1925), Venezuelan nun
 Gilda Cordero-Fernando (born 1932), Filipina writer and publisher
 Joaquín Cordero (1923–2013), Mexican actor
 Jorge Cordero (musician) (born 1952), Cuban singer, guitarist and percussionist
 Jorge Cordero (footballer) (born 1962), Peruvian footballer
 Juan Cordero (1822–1884), Mexican painter and muralist
 Juan César Cordero Dávila (1904–1965), Puerto Rican Major General in the US Army
 León Febres Cordero (1931–2008), President of Ecuador 1984–1988
 Luca Cordero di Montezemolo (born 1947), Italian businessman, Chairman of Ferrari
 Luis Cordero Crespo (1833–1912), President of Ecuador 1892–1895
 Maria Cordero (a.k.a. Fat Mama Maria) (born 1954), singer, actress, and chef from Macau
 Mario Cordero (a.k.a. Catato) (1930–2002), Costa Rican professional football player and coach
 Miguel Febres Cordero (1854–1910), Ecuadoran educator, member of the Christian Brothers order
 Nick Cordero (1978–2020), Canadian actor
 Olga Sánchez Cordero (born 1955), Mexican jurist, Supreme Court Justice
 Paquito Cordero (1932–2009), Puerto Rican comedian and television producer
 Rafael "Churumba" Cordero Santiago (1942–2004), Puerto Rican politician, Mayor of Ponce 1989–2004
 Rafael Cordero (1790–1868), Puerto Rican educator, known as “The Father of Public Education in Puerto Rico”
 Rodrigo Cordero (born 1973), Costa Rican professional football player
 Víctor Cordero (born 1973), Costa Rican professional football player
 Roque Cordero (1917–2008), Panamanian-American composer
 Sebastián Cordero (born 1972), Ecuadoran film director, writer, and editor
 Wil Cordero (a.k.a. Coco) (born 1971), Puerto Rican professional baseball player
 Winnie Cordero (born 1966), Filipina comedian, actress, and TV host

See also
Camp Cordero Water Aerodrome, aerodrome in British Columbia, Canada
Estadio Eladio Rosabal Cordero, stadium in Heredia, Costa Rica
Cordero Rojo Mine, coal mine in Wyoming, United States

Italian-language surnames
Spanish-language surnames